Yo! The game was first released in Japan on March 16, 1990 and was localized in the United States to promote the Noid, the mascot of Domino's Pizza. The game is in Nintendo's PlayChoice-10 arcade series and was featured in the Japanese TV show GameCenter CX.

Plot
In Yo! Noid, wild creatures led by Mr. Green are running amok around New York City. As they cause havoc, the Mayor of New York decides to call upon the Noid to stop his evil duplicate, save everyone, and give him a massive pizza reward.

Gameplay 

Both games use a modified engine of Wagan Land and share the same gameplay. The protagonist (Hanamaru or Noid) has no life meter, and loses a life by either making contact with an enemy or running out of time before completing a level. For offense, both characters use different weapons (a Hawk for Hanamaru and a yo-yo for Noid) but can gather magic points by collecting scrolls and use them for screen-clearing special attacks or very rare power-ups, both kinds of which are found in large scrolls opened with their weapons. Extra lives are awarded for every 20,000 points scored. Most levels are traveled on foot, but exceptions include a skateboard and an autogyro (Hanamaru uses his hawk companion for flight). Minigames vary for each version. In Hanamaru, for example, the player whacks penguins in one stage and Yo! Noid uses a "Pizza Crusher" level, as on the "Avoid the Noid" advertisements. Boss battles in Hanamaru utilize a card-based system and Yo! Noid focuses on pizza-eating contests.

The instruction manual of Yo! Noid includes a $1 Domino's Pizza coupon.

Development

Kamen no Ninja Hanamaru was based on the Wagan Land engine. During American localization, Capcom teamed up with Domino's Pizza to promote the Noid by changing a lot of graphics, sound, and presentation. However, none of the game mechanics were changed. The localized game was released in the rest of the world as Yo! Noid in November 1990. Most of the music was reused for Yo! Noid, changing a few tunes and creating a few new tracks for a more American atmosphere. Namco Bandai Games published the Wagan Land series, and Capcom published both Hanamaru and Yo! Noid.

Kamen no Ninja Hanamaru was first released in Japan on March 16, 1990.

Legacy
On August 1, 2017, a fan-made sequel titled Yo! Noid 2: Enter the Void was released online as freeware. Originally developed as part of the New Jam City 2017 game jam, it features elements from fifth-generation console platform games. On July 1, 2018, a "Game of a Year Edition" was released.

Notes

References

1990 video games
Advergames
Works based on advertisements
Capcom games
Domino's Pizza
Video games about ninja
Nintendo Entertainment System games
Now Production games
PlayChoice-10 games
Platform games
Side-scrolling video games
Video games about food and drink
Video games developed in Japan
Video games set in New York City
Single-player video games